Horizons is an arts scheme and music festival launched jointly in 2014 by BBC Cymru Wales and the Arts Council of Wales to develop new independent contemporary music artists. It is curated by BBC presenter Bethan Elfyn.

The scheme hosts a yearly showcase, but also displays its artists through slots at major domestic and international festivals, as well as securing studio access at the likes of Rockfield and Maida Vale.

Editions

2014 
In February 2014, the scheme launched and first took part of the National Eisteddfod in Llanelli, promoting artists including musician Chris Jones on the Llwyfan Perfformio.

In May 2014, Horizons was named as 'Horizons 12' and announced the first twelve artists for the inceptive event. Over 300 applicants were reviewed by the scheme, and among the final artists were:

 Candelas - an indie rock group from Llanuwchllyn, in Gwynedd
 Casi Wyn - a singer songwriter from Bangor, based in London
 Chris Jones - a Welsh and Celtic folk singer from Cwm-y-glo, near Caernarfon
 Kizzy Crawford - a Welsh language singer songwriter of Bajan heritage from Merthyr Tydfil
 Plu - an alternative folk sibling trio from Snowdonia
 Sŵnami - an indie rock group from Dolgellau
 Baby Queens
 Climbing Trees
 Gabrielle Murphy
 Houdini Dax
 Seazoo
 The People The Poet

2015 

In 2015, the scheme began the year with involvement in the inaugural X Music Festival which took place in June in Bute Park, Cardiff.

The 2015 edition of Horizons was held at the Chapter Arts Centre in Canton, Cardiff, and at the Swn Festival at the various venues (including Clwb Ifor Bach) on Womanby Street in the city.

2015 featured group Cut Ribbons would go on to be highlighted by the Fred Perry 'Subculture' campaign for their track We Want to Watch Something We Loved Burn.

Among the artists named were:

 A six-member band led by Aled Rheon, brother of Iwan Rheon
 Dan Bettridge
 Hannah Grace - a Welsh singer songwriter from Bridgend
 Peasant's King
 Mellt
 Violet Skies, a singer songwriter from Chepstow, Monmouthshire
 Yr Eira
 HMS Morris
 Y Reu
 Delyth McLean
 Cold Committee
 Cut Ribbons

2016 

2016 saw events showcasing bands from across Wales, with events hosted at Moon Club on Womanby Street, as well as at the DimSwn event. The scheme also participated in Festival N°6, on the Lost in the Woods Stage.

Artists Danielle Lewis and David Ian Roberts were also covered on Folk Radio for their releases that year, which were recorded as a result of BBC and Arts Council funding.

 Afro Cluster - a Cardiff-based collective of musicians from all over South Wales
 ANELOG
 CASEY
 CaStLeS - a psychedelic pop trio from Llanrug
 Connah Evans
 Danielle Lewis - a singer-songwriter from New Quay
 Fleur De Lys
 Reuel Elijah - a hip-hop/R&B singer from Cardiff
 Roughion
 Tibet
 We're No Heroes
 Ysgol Sul - a three piece from Llandeilo

2018 

The 2018 festival saw a showcase at the Portmeirion Festival N°6 event, including NoGood Boyo, Alffa, Campfire Social, and a headline slot for I See Rivers.

The scheme also exhibited at The Great Escape Festival in Brighton, from The Last Music Bar. It saw performances from Boy Azooga, CHROMA, Mrphy, The Gentle Good, Nia Wyn, Rachel K Collier, Trampolene, The Himalayas, and Dream State.

The year also saw engagements with Welsh Language Music Day at Gower College in Swansea, and in the audience were a range of attendees including Newport rap group Goldie Lookin' Chain.

The year's selection made a notable decision to select a number of female musicians (consisting of 10 of the 12 person line up) and including artists from indie, reggae, rock, folk and blues genres.

The scheme invited Adwaith, Alffa, Aleighcia Scott, Campfire Social, Marged, Nia Wyn, and I See Rivers to all perform and record at Rockfield Studios (of Queen and Oasis fame)., as well as hosting a performance at Tramshed, Cardiff with Himalayas.

 Adwaith
 Aleighcia Scott
 Alffa
 Campfire Social
 CHROMA
 Eädyth
Himalayas
 I See Rivers
 Marged
 Nia Wyn
 Nogood Boyo
 The Pitchforks

2019 

The lineup for the 2019 edition was announced in June, described as including "a dreamy indie-pop band whose music has appeared on Black Mirror and Made in Chelsea, an electro teenage pop artist, a live rock, rap and reggae group, a jazz singer, a dance producer and one of the fastest banjo players in Wales."

The artwork for the event was commissioned to Welsh artist Cadi Lane, and installed along Womanby Street.

 Codewalkers
 Darren Eedens & The Slim Pickin's
 Endaf
 Esther
 Eve Goodman
 Gwilym
 Hana2k
 Jack Perrett
 Kidsmoke
 Rosehip Teahouse
 Sera
 Y Cledrau

2022 

The lineup for the 2022 edition was announced in February and received its largerst ever funding since its launch.

 Alice Low
 Anwar Sizbar
 Aisha Kigs
 Alekxsandr
 Asha Jane
 Bandicoot
 The Bug Club
 Chasing Shadows
 Celavi
 Clwb Fuzz
 Cerys Hafana
 CI Gofod
 Cupsofte
 Gwenno Morgan
 Hana Lili
 Hemes
 Teddy Hunter
 James and the Cold Gun
 K(E)NZ
 Kinnigan
 Kim Hon
 Harry Jowett
 LEMFRECK
 Lloydy Lew
 Luke RV
 Mace The Great
 Malan
 Mali Haf
 Mantaraybryn
 Mirari More
 Niques
 Panta Ray
 Rebecca Hurn
 Roman Yasin
 Skylark
 Soren Araujo
 Sybs
 Su Sang Song
 Szwe
 Tara Bandito
 Tapestri
 Thallo
 Winger Records
 Wobbli Boi
 Want
 Voya
 Yazmean
 XL Life

See also 

 Music of Cardiff
 Music of Newport
 Music of Wales
 Culture and recreation in Cardiff
 Huw Stephens
 Bethan Elfyn
 Welsh language

References

External links 

 

Music festivals in Wales
Festivals in Cardiff
Annual events in Wales
Music in Cardiff
Recurring events established in 2014
Welsh music
Welsh music awards